Prionurus microlepidotus is a subtropical fish found in coral reefs in the western Pacific ocean. It is commonly known as the sixplate sawtail or sawtail surgeonfish. It is sometimes used in aquariums.

References

sixplate sawtail
Fish of Palau
Fish of the Pacific Ocean
sixplate sawtail